The A847 road is one of the two principal roads of Islay in the Inner Hebrides off the west coast of mainland Scotland.

It connects Bridgend, at a junction with the A846 road, with Portnahaven at the southern end of the Rinns of Islay peninsula.

Settlements on or near the A847
North to South
Bridgend
Blackrock
Bruichladdich
Port Charlotte
Nerabus (Nereabolls)
Easter Ellister
Portnahaven

References

Roads in Scotland
Islay